Leonardo Mayer won the first edition of the tournament 7–5, 7–6(7–1) in the final against Nikola Ćirić.

Seeds

Draw

Finals

Top half

Bottom half

References
 Main Draw
 Qualifying Draw

Sao Leo Open - Singles
2011 Singles